Gambier is a commune of French Polynesia in the administrative subdivision of the Tuamotu-Gambier Islands. The commune includes the Gambier Islands as well as several atolls in the Tuamotu Archipelago (the Acteon Group and the isolated atolls of Maria Est, Morane, and Marutea Sud). All the Tuamotu atolls belonging to the commune are uninhabited except for Marutea Sud, and are sometimes mistakenly included among the Gambier Islands themselves. The commune population was 1,535 at the 2017 census. Its total land area is 45.97 km2.

Administration
The commune of Gambier is made up of the following islands:

Akamaru
Angakauitai
Aukena
Kamaka
Makaroa
Mangareva
Manui
Maria
Marutea Sud
Matureivavao
Morane
Taravai
Temoe
Tenararo
Tenarunga
Vahanga

The chef-lieu of the commune is the village Rikitea on the island of Mangareva.

Together with the Tuamotus, the Gambier Islands form the administrative subdivision Îles Tuamotu-Gambier (French officially: la subdivision administrative des îles Tuamotu-Gambier), one of the five primary administrative divisions of French Polynesia.

The commune Gambier, together with the communes in the eastern part of the Tuamotus (Anaa, Fangatau, Hao, Hikueru, Makemo, Napuka, Nukutavake, Puka-Puka, Reao, Tatakoto and Tureia), forms Îles Gambier et Tuamotu de l'Est, one of the 8 electoral sections for the Assembly of French Polynesia (Assemblée de la Polynésie française).

History
see Gambier Islands

See also

 Communes of French Polynesia

References

External links

Communes of French Polynesia